CCAC may refer to:

 Canadian Council on Animal Care
 California College of Arts and Crafts
 Chicagoland Collegiate Athletic Conference, an athletic conference affiliated with the National Association of Intercollegiate Athletics (NAIA)
 Community Circus Arts Corporation
 Community College of Allegheny County, Pittsburgh, Pennsylvania
 Comissariado contra a Corrupção, Commission Against Corruption (Macau)
 Citizens Coinage Advisory Committee
 Climate and Clean Air Coalition to Reduce Short-Lived Climate Pollutants
 Changi Coast Adventure Centre (Singapore)